Juan Carlos del Valle (born 1975) is a realist painter. He alters icons from contemporary myths, such as processed food, toys, and fantastic narratives. From 2004 to 2017 he presented more than forty exhibitions throughout Mexico, the United States and Peru. More recently, his work has addressed relational art, which employs and addresses social and human relationships.

Biography

Juan Carlos del Valle was born in Mexico City on August 9th 1975. Disillusioned with academic training, in 1995 he joined the studio of Demetrio Llordén (1931–2000), who had studied with painter José Bardasano (1910–1979). After Llordén died on 26 December 2000, Del Valle took classes with painter José Manuel Schmill (1934–) focusing on the study of landscapes.

Work

The book Oscuridad Luminosa ("Luminous Darkness")  was published in 2002; the volume contains a selection of Del Valle's drawings from 1997 to 2002.

The second volume of his work, entitled El juicio de los ojos ("The eyes within"), was jointly produced by the Instituto Nacional de Bellas Artes (National Institute of Fine Arts) and the publishing house RM in 2006. The volume offers essays on his oeuvre by Jorge Reynoso Pohlenz, Ricardo Pérez Escamilla, and Jaime Moreno Villarreal. Focusing on his work from 2000 to 2006, it includes pencil and charcoal drawings as well as oil paintings.

The works in El juicio de los ojos were presented in an exhibition that traveled to museums in cities throughout Mexico and the volume also served as an exhibition catalogue. Also in 2006 the documentary Juan Carlos del Valle. Pintor ("Juan Carlos del Valle. Painter") was released.

El devenir de la luz ("The Progression of Light", 2006), a collection of paintings and drawings, was exhibited at the Museo de la Ciudad de México (Museum of Mexico City). Meanwhile, El juicio de los ojos traveled around the country and under the name The Eyes Within was presented at the Instituto Cultural de México in San Antonio, Texas in 2007.

A reading alluding to Christian symbols gave rise to the project El pan de cada día ("Our Daily Bread"), produced in collaboration with Caritas, Mexico City, IAP. The twenty-five canvases in this series were exhibited in the interior of churches in several Mexico City neighborhoods.

After the success of El pan de cada día, thirty events held in twelve churches in Mexico City and one in Metepec, attended by 26,577 people,  Del Valle was invited to present the opening exhibition in the Museo del Chocolate (Chocolate Museum) in Mexico City on 22nd March 2012. His exhibition, Del Choco que Late ("Mad for Chocolate") contained twenty-two works that interpreted chocolate as a metaphor for desire and prohibition. This exhibition was followed by Deseo... ese obscuro objeto (Desire, That Obscure Object), which was presented by the gallery Diego de Ybarra & Natalia Davila Fine Art in Mexico City.

That same year he drew thirty-five portraits of the singer Chavela Vargas, whom he had met a year earlier in Tepoztlán, Morelos. The collection was exhibited in June 2012 at the Centro Cultural de España en México, Mexico City.

In March 2013 Del Valle presented the commemorative exhibition honoring the twentieth anniversary of the Museo Felipe Santiago Gutiérrez of the Instituto Mexiquense de Cultura, in the city of Toluca. The exhibition Para comerte mejor ("The Better to Eat You With"), composed of sixty-five medium- and small-format oil on canvas works done from 2009 to 2012, marked a shift from the subject matter dealt with by the artist in previous stages of his work and explored new concerns. The collection had been presented earlier in the Centro Cultural Isidro Fabela, in the Museo Casa del Risco in Mexico City.

Del Valle was the first Latin American artist to be invited to show his work at the Museum of Biblical Art in Dallas, Texas. His show Temptation, which opened in September, 2013, consisted of fifty-two small- and medium-format paintings of mass-produced snack foods, exploring the transition between the duality of human nature and the point of inflection between the sacred and the profane, which is found in temptation. Activities organized in parallel with the show included a symposium at the University of Texas at Dallas on 23 March 2014, focusing on the relationship between food, art, culture, health, and religion.

In April 2014, Del Valle's intervened self-portrait Yo... ("Me...") (2010) was selected to form part of the international traveling exhibition from the José Pinto Mazal Collection, Messico Circa 2000, which opened at Miramare Castle in Trieste, Italy, before moving on to Lomellini Palace in Turin, Italy, and then to Gjethuset, Frederiksvaerk, Denmark and to the Cultural Institute of Mexico in Paris, France. The artist presented his show Yo Mero ("Me, Myself and I"), based on the selfie, at the Gallery of the Ministry of Economy in Mexico City, in March, 2015.

Because of his interest in generating experiences that expand upon painting and intersect with other disciplines, Del Valle participated in the February 2013 performance of Engelbert Humperdinck’s opera Hansel and Gretel at the Fine Arts Palace in Mexico City, featuring a curtain designed by him. In 2017, Grover Wilkins, director of the Orchestra of New Spain from Dallas, Texas, invited Juan Carlos del Valle to project 9 paintings onto the backdrop of the Dallas City Performance Hall. The projections were part of an interdisciplinary and multicultural collaboration in which two different performances took place: Francesco Corselli's Misa Ave Maris Stella alternated with flamenco dance led by choreographer Danica Sena.

References

External links

1975 births
Mexican painters
Living people